Decidedly (March 3, 1959 – November 12, 1984) was an American Thoroughbred racehorse who is best known for winning the 1962 Kentucky Derby.

Background
Decidedly was a gray horse bred in California by George Pope. His sire Determine from whom he inherited his gray coat, won the Kentucky Derby in 1954. Decidedly's dam Gloire Fille was descended from the broodmare La France (foaled 1928) who was the female line ancestor of numerous other major winners including Phalanx, Danzig Connection and Johnstown.

Racing career

Ridden by Bill Hartack, Decidedly set a new Churchill Downs track record for 1¼ miles in winning the 1962 Derby. In the second leg and third legs of the U.S. Triple Crown series, the Preakness and Belmont Stakes, he was unplaced.

In 1963 Decidedly won five of thirteen starts and set a new Keeneland Race Course record for 11/16 miles in winning the Ben Ali Handicap. He was retired from racing at age five after the 1964 season in which he won two races from ten starts.

Stud record
At stud, Decidedly was the sire of nineteen stakes race winners.

Pedigree

References

 1962 Kentucky Derby charts

1959 racehorse births
Racehorses bred in California
Racehorses trained in the United States
Kentucky Derby winners
Thoroughbred family 17-b